Royal Jubilee Hospital is a 500-bed general hospital in Victoria, British Columbia, Canada located about  east of the city centre, in the Jubilee neighbourhood (itself named after the hospital).

Overview
Its name commemorates the Golden Jubilee of Queen Victoria in 1887. Founded in 1890, Royal Jubilee was Victoria's main hospital until 1983, when an expanded Victoria General Hospital re-opened in the suburban municipality of View Royal. Royal Jubilee offers critical-care, surgery, diagnostics, emergency facilities and other patient programs. It has a particular focus on cardiac medicine.

In 2007, the British Columbia government announced that it would expand and renovate the hospital, increasing the number of beds to 500 and replacing many buildings.
The new 500-bed patient care centre (PCC) was opened to the public in early 2011.

Campus map

Island Health hosts a PDF campus map for the Royal Jubilee Hospital, as well as the variety of services offered at RJH.

Begbie Hall

Begbie Hall, a three-storey former nurses' residence at the hospital, was designated a National Historic Site of Canada in 1989 to commemorate the growing professionalism of nursing in the early 20th century and the contribution of nurses to health care in Canada.  Today, Begbie Hall is used for administrative offices, and contains the Woodward Theatre for meetings. The Woodward Theatre was apparently the original cafeteria for the resident nurses. The Island Health Board of Directors removed the name Begbie from the building in 2021.

Pemberton Memorial Operating Room

The octagonal Pemberton Memorial Operating Room, completed in 1896, was designated a National Historic Site in 2005. It is an octagonal brick operating room; a rare surviving example of a late 19th-century surgical facility from the period when hospitals were transitioning from primarily charitable to scientific institutions.

See also 
 List of historic places in Victoria, British Columbia

References 

Buildings and structures in Victoria, British Columbia
Hospitals in British Columbia
Hospitals established in 1890
Heliports in Canada
Certified airports in British Columbia
1890 establishments in British Columbia